The Ukrainian Orthodox Church of the USA (UOC of USA) is a jurisdiction of the Ecumenical Patriarchate in the United States. It consists of two eparchies (dioceses), ruled by two bishops, including about 85 active parishes and missions.  The Church's current leader is Metropolitan Antony. The Church's head offices and Consistory are based in South Bound Brook, New Jersey.

History

Autocephalous Church

In 1942, when persecution of the Church in Ukraine eased under the German occupation, a number of bishops were consecrated for the Ukrainian Orthodox Church there. One of these bishops, Archbishop Mstyslav (Skrypnyk), emigrated to Canada in 1948 to head the jurisdiction of the Ukrainian Orthodox Church of Canada. In 1949, however, he moved to the U.S. and joined the group of Bishop Bohdan (Spylka). After Archbishop Mstyslav's departure from Canada (after a disagreement with the Canadian Church's governance), the Canadian Church was headed by Metropolitan Hilarion Ohienko. Mstyslav desired the unity of the two jurisdictions and worked to reconcile the two churches and convince Teodorovych to accept re-consecration as a condition for union.

In 1950, the two rival jurisdictions held synods (in the same cathedral in New York) at which unification was approved by both, and on October 13, a combined unification synod was held, with both groups signing onto union. A number of clergy and parishes under Bishop Bohdan (Spylka) were unconvinced of the sincerity of the "UOC of USA" group, however, and convinced him to reject the union. Union was proclaimed, but it was not complete, lacking the support of Spylka and those who had convinced him to remain separate. Archbishop Mstyslav joined the new united church - the Ukrainian Orthodox Church of the US, along with a number of Spylkas' parishes, and the union was celebrated on October 14 by those who participated.

Mstyslav died three years after his election as Patriarch, His death was followed by an enormous division of the UOC in Ukraine, and in the United States. He was buried in a crypt under St. Andrew's Memorial church in South Bound Brook, US. After the death of Patriarch Mstyslav, on October 20, 1993 Volodymr (Romaniuk), at that time was the Metropolitan of Chernigov was elected Patriarch of Kyiv and all Rus-Ukraine. Archbishop Antony was also present at the local council as he was a candidate for the position of Patriarch as well.

Renouncing Autocephaly and joining the Metropolia of the Ecumenical Patriarchate

Following the death of Patriarch Mstyslav in 1993, Archbishop Antony (Archbishop within the UOC-USA) was a candidate at the “Sobor” (conclave) of the Mother Church in Kyiv, Ukraine, to succeed him as Patriarch of the UOC-Ukraine. Archbishop Antony subsequently was unsuccessful in his candidacy, and shortly thereafter, together with his followers within the UOC-USA, despite Patriarch Mstyslav's decree to remain independent, clandestinely entered into contracts, and understandings with the Greek Patriarchate Church of Constantinople (Istanbul, Turkey). Archbishop Antony and his followers eventually became hierarchs of the Greek Patriarchate Church and assumed Greek Bishop Titles.  The Greek Orthodox Church in Istanbul now claims that the UOC-USA is under its jurisdiction and that the diocese is no longer Autocephalous (independent) and all parish properties belong to the bishops. 1994 the Hierarchs of the UOC-USA met with the Ecumenical Patriarch in Istanbul, at the Patriarch's invitation, and came to an agreement recognizing the canonicity of the Church and accepting the UOC-USA and the entire Ukrainian Orthodox Church in the Diaspora into Ecumenical Patriarchate.  Part of the agreement also included Protocol 937 between Patriarch Bartholomew of the Ecumenical Patriarchate and Patriarch Alexei of the Russian Orthodox Church which detailed that the terms of the Russian Church accepting the EP's absorption of the UOCUSA under her omophorion was that the Ukrainian Orthodox Church of the USA must renounce their autocephaly and not aid the church in Ukraine.

On October 6, 2007, the 18th Regular Sobor of the UOC-USA nominated Hieromonk Daniel as Bishop-Elect for the UOC of the USA. On January 9, 2008, Patriarch Bartholomew and the Great and Holy Synod of Constantinople formally elected and ritually included Archimandrite Daniel in the Diptychs of Holy Orthodoxy as titular Bishop of Pamphilon. Bishop Daniel was consecrated as bishop in May 2008, at St. Vladimir Ukrainian Orthodox Cathedral, Parma, OH.

Schism

The act of renouncing autocephaly and entering the omophorion  of the Ecumenical Patriarchate, which left the UOC-USA with no direct tie to any of the Orthodox churches in Ukraine, led to several parishes leaving the UOC-USA to enter under the omophorion of the Kyiv Patriarchate in Ukraine, although some supporters of these parishes argue that it is they who remain in the same church and that it is the hierarchy of the UOC-USA which is now in a different church.

A lengthy lawsuit which in 1999 the UOC-USA began against one such parish, the Church of the Holy Ascension in Clifton, NJ, discouraged some other parishes from taking similar action.  Although New Jersey's Appellate Division eventually sided with the parishioners of Holy Ascension against the UOC-USA and the New Jersey Supreme Court denied certification of the issue, in 2007, the Consistory of the UOC-USA filed a fresh suit against the Church of the Holy Ascension.  After this suit was dismissed with prejudice by the Superior Court of New Jersey in June 2008, the UOC-USA filed an appeal, but on August 19, 2009, the Appellate Division affirmed the dismissal, holding "that Holy Ascension, and not the UOC-USA, has title to the property". The UOC-USA again appealed to the New Jersey Supreme Court, which, on December 9, 2009, again denied certification.

Despite the court ruling, the UOC-USA website until 2014 continued to list the Church of the Holy Ascension and several other parishes which were legally part of the UOC-KP as parishes of the UOC-USA.

Structure

 the Ukrainian Orthodox Church in the USA was divided into two eparchies (dioceses):

 Eastern Eparchy (North Carolina, Connecticut, Delaware, Massachusetts, Maryland, New Jersey, New York City, Eastern Pennsylvania, Rhode Island, Virginia), headed by Metropolitan Antony (New York City, New York-Washington D.C.)
 Western Eparchy (Arizona, California, Illinois, Indiana, Michigan, Minnesota, Nebraska, New Mexico, Oregon, Washington, Wisconsin, Florida, Georgia, Ohio, Upstate New York, Western Pennsylvania), headed by Archbishop Daniel (Chicago, Illinois)

In total, there are about 80 parishes and one seminary - St. Sophia Ukrainian Orthodox Theological Seminary in South Bound Brook, New Jersey. Many parishes have been closing despite moves over the past few years to conduct the liturgy in English and appoint convert priests to appeal to the masses. Besides the two hierarchs, the clergy consist of 106 priests and 15 deacons. 15 of the parishes currently have either no pastor or are served by clergy in their deanery.

See also
Ukrainian Orthodox Church of Canada
History of Christianity in Ukraine
St. Andrew Cathedral, Silver Spring
Ukrainian History and Education Center

Notes

References
 Text originally taken from Orthodoxwiki:Ukrainian Orthodox Church in the USA
 Hewlett, Dn. Edward. The Formation of the Ukrainian Orthodox Church of Canada
 Surrency, Archim. Serafim. The Quest for Orthodox Church Unity in America: A History of the Orthodox Church in North America in the Twentieth Century. New York: Saints Boris and Gleb Press, 1973.
 Eastern Christian Churches: The Ukrainian Orthodox Church of the US and Diaspora, by Ronald Roberson, a Roman Catholic priest and scholar
 An Outline of the History of the Metropolia Center of the Ukrainian Orthodox Church of the USA (official website)

External links
 official website
 old website
 Profile of the UOC-USA on the Association of Religion Data Archives website
 Article on the UOC-USA by Ronald Roberson on the CNEWA website

 
Ukrainian Orthodox church bodies
Ecumenical Patriarchate of Constantinople
Christian organizations established in 1915
Eastern Orthodox Church bodies in North America
Ukrainian-American history
Christian denominations established in the 20th century
Eastern Orthodox organizations established in the 20th century
Members of the National Council of Churches
Ukrainian Orthodoxy in the United States